Sodium trimethylsiloxide is an organosilicon compound with the formula NaOSi(CH3)3.  It is the sodium salt of the conjugate base derived from trimethylsilanol. A white solid, its molecular structure consists of a cluster with Na-O-Na linkages on the basis of closely related compounds.

The salt is used to prepare trimethylsiloxide complexes by salt metathesis.  Trimethylsiloxide is a lipophilic pseudohalide. 

It is a source of oxide dianion.

Related compounds
Sodium silox, NaOSi(CMe3)3 (Me = CH3)
Potassium trimethylsilanolate

References

Trimethylsilyl compounds
Sodium compounds